Teona Bostashvili (born January 19, 1998) is a Georgian swimmer. She competed at the 2016 Summer Olympics in the women's 100 metre backstroke; her time of 1:22.91 in the heats did not qualify her for the semifinals.

References

1998 births
Living people
Female swimmers from Georgia (country)
Olympic swimmers of Georgia (country)
Swimmers at the 2016 Summer Olympics
Female backstroke swimmers